The Conservative Group is a liberal conservative party group on the Nordic Council.

Members
The member organizations of the Conservative Group are:

In the European Parliament, the MEPs of the member parties are part of the European People's Party parliamentary group.

Elected representatives of Member Parties

European institutions

References

Pan-European political parties
European People's Party
Conservative parties in Europe
Scandinavian political parties
Party groups in the Nordic Council